Arunāsva, also known as Aluonashun by the Chinese, ruled Tirhut, Kannauj, and the surrounding area for a brief period after Harshavardhana, who died heirless. He usurped the throne, succeeding the Pushyabhuti dynasty. He is known for repulsing an invasion launched by the Arab Muslims of the Rashidun Caliphate.

Reign
After emperor Harshavardhana's death, he usurped the throne and became the new king of Kannauj. He was the emperor's former minister. In 648, the Tang dynasty's emperor Tang Taizong sent Wang Xuance to India in response to emperor Harsha having sent an ambassador to China. However once in India he discovered Harsha had died and the new king Aluonashun (supposedly Arunāsva) attacked Wang and his 30 mounted subordinates. This led to Wang Xuance escaping to Tibet and then mounting a joint of over 7,000 Nepalese mounted infantry and 1,200 Tibetan infantry and attack on the Indian state on June 16. The success of this attack won Xuance the title of the "Grand Master for the Closing Court." (Note that this is not a prestigious title, only in the 5th rank of Tang's nine-rank official system)  He also secured a reported Buddhist relic for China. 2,000 prisoners were taken from Magadha by the Nepali and Tibetan forces under Wang. Tibetan and Chinese writings document describe Wang Xuance's raid on India with Tibetan soldiers. Nepal had been subdued by the Tibetan King Songtsen. The Indian pretender was among the captives. The war happened in 649. Taizong's grave had a statue of the Indian pretender. The pretender's name was recorded in Chinese records as "Na-fu-ti O-lo-na-shuen" (Dinafudi is probably a reference to Tirabhukti).

References

Indian royalty

People from Kannauj
Usurpers
Tang dynasty diplomats
History of Uttar Pradesh
 6th century in India
 6th-century Indian monarchs